The 1905–06 Carnegie Tech Tartans men's ice hockey season was the inaugural season of play for the program.

Season
The team played three games during their inaugural season. The team was prepared to play more matches but scheduling opponents was an issue.

Roster

Standings

Schedule and Results

|-
!colspan=12 style=";" | Regular Season

References

Carnegie Tech Tartans men's ice hockey seasons
Carnegie Tech
Carnegie Tech
Carnegie Tech
Carnegie Tech